Whitney Kent Newey (born July 17, 1954) is the Jane Berkowitz Carlton and Dennis William Carlton Professor of Economics at the Massachusetts Institute of Technology and a well-known econometrician. He is best known for developing, with Kenneth D. West, the Newey–West estimator, which robustly estimates the covariance matrix of a regression model when errors are heteroskedastic and autocorrelated.

Education and academic career
Newey received his B.A. from Brigham Young University in 1978, and his Ph.D. from the Massachusetts Institute of Technology in 1983, under supervision of Jerry A. Hausman. From 1983 to 1988, Newey taught at Princeton University as an assistant professor. He was then promoted to Associate Professor and taught there for another two year from 1988 to 1990. It is also during these two years, he became a Member of Technical Staff, Bell Communications Research. During his time in Princeton University, he published many papers on econometrics. 
After 7 years in Princeton, he returned to Massachusetts Institute of Technology as a Professor in the department of Economics in 1990 and has been in the department of Economics since then. From 2011 to 2016, he was also the chair of Economics.

References

External links
 Newey's faculty page at MIT
 https://www.flickr.com/photos/97630327@N03/9068809425

Publications
 
 
 
 
 
 
 
 
 

21st-century American economists
MIT School of Humanities, Arts, and Social Sciences faculty
Fellows of the Econometric Society
Econometricians
Living people
Fellows of the American Academy of Arts and Sciences
1954 births
Brigham Young University alumni
MIT School of Humanities, Arts, and Social Sciences alumni